The O'Leary Eagles were a Canadian Junior ice hockey club from O'Leary, Prince Edward Island.  They were members of the Island Junior Hockey League and were 2002 Don Johnson Cup Maritime Junior B champions.

History
In their final year of operation, the O'Leary Eagles led the Island Junior Hockey League with a record of 25 wins, 3 losses, and 2 overtime losses.  In the playoffs, they defeated the Kings County Sharks, Summerside Red Wings, and Sherwood Falcons to win the IJHL championship for the only time and for entry into the 2002 Don Johnson Cup.

As host and champion in the Don Johnson Cup, the Eagles finished in first place overall in the round robin and received a berth into the tournament final.  In the final, the Eagles defeated the Nova Scotia Junior Hockey League's Strait Pirates 5–2 to win Prince Edward Island's first ever Don Johnson Cup. The O'Leary Eagles Franchise had played their last game; They have not returned to the League after their Island / Don Johnson Cup Championship in 2002.

Season-by-season record

External links
IJHL Website

Ice hockey teams in Prince Edward Island
2002 disestablishments in Prince Edward Island
Sports clubs disestablished in 2002
Sports clubs established in the 1990s
1990s establishments in Prince Edward Island